Willis Lucullus Palmer (December 13, 1854 – October 30, 1912) was an American politician, who was the twelfth Mayor of Orlando from 1891 to 1893. He was also the president of Hamilton College.

Biography
Willis Lucullus Palmer was born in Troup County, Georgia on December 13, 1854.

He married Martha B. McAllister on March 4, 1891.

He died in Orlando on October 30, 1912, and was interred at Greenwood Cemetery.

References

1854 births
1912 deaths
19th-century American politicians
Mayors of Orlando, Florida